"Sucks to Be You" is also the name of a song by Clinton Sparks, LMFAO, Emma Blackery, and Danielle Peck.

"Sucks to Be You" is a song by Canadian pop duo Prozzäk, released as the second single from their debut album Hot Show (1998). The song peaked at #25 on the Canadian Singles Chart published by RPM. Member and songwriter Jay Levine stated the song was based on an awkward encounter with a groupie as well as a comedy routine by filmmaker/comedian Woody Allen. TV writer/producer Stacy Taub says it is about her saying, "it means he didn't realize how much he hurt me until he had been hurt the way he hurt me."

Like other music videos by Prozzäk, the one accompanying this song is also animated.

Track listing

Charts

References

1999 singles
Animated music videos
Canadian pop songs
Sony Music singles
Songs written by Jason Levine